George Reginald Parkinson (10 December 1893 – 25 October 1960) was an Australian rules footballer who played with Essendon in the Victorian Football League (VFL).

Notes

External links 

1893 births
1960 deaths
Australian rules footballers from Victoria (Australia)
Essendon Football Club players